Vibeke Nielsen (born 1959) is a Danish former cricketer. She played 26 Women's One Day International matches for the Denmark women's national cricket team between 1989 and 1999.

References

External links
 

1959 births
Living people
Danish women cricketers
Denmark women One Day International cricketers
Place of birth missing (living people)